The canton of Guingamp is an administrative division of the Côtes-d'Armor department, northwestern France. Its borders were modified at the French canton reorganisation which came into effect in March 2015. Its seat is in Guingamp.

It consists of the following communes:
 
Goudelin
Grâces
Guingamp
Le Merzer
Pabu
Plouisy
Ploumagoar
Pommerit-le-Vicomte
Saint-Agathon

References

Cantons of Côtes-d'Armor